David Haney (born 1955) is an American jazz pianist and publisher of Cadence magazine.

Career
As an infant, Haney's family moved from Fresno, California, to Calgary, Alberta. He began piano studies at the age of nine, and started playing guitar when he was fifteen. He attended Sacramento City College and the University of New Orleans. At  Clark College in Vancouver, Washington, he studied music theory and took private lessons with jazz pianist Eddie Weid. From 1980–1985 he studied privately with Czech-American composer Tomáš Svoboda.

His works were performed twice at the Berg Swann Auditorium in Portland, in 1980 and 1982, and at Linfield College in McMinnville, Oregon in 1982. He was commissioned in 1984 to provide the music for a benefit fundraiser for the Oregon Ballet Theatre, which included the Dance Theatre of Harlem. He received commissions from private individuals and  recorded music for film through Alberta Filmworks in 1988. From 1980 to 1990, he wrote over 100 liturgical works. In 1997, he changed his focus to performing rather than composing; his first tour was with Roswell Rudd in Canada that year, then with Julian Priester in 1998. In 1999, he played at Yoshi's in Oakland, California with John Tchicai. In 2000, he performed solo at the Pacific Rim Chamber Festival in Tofino, Canada and the Calgary International Jazz Festival. He played in Portland in 2001 with Bud Shank and again with Julian Priester and Obo Addy.

On September 26, 2001 he played a solo concert six blocks from ground zero of the September 11 attacks on the World Trade Center. He has performed at The Knitting Factory and in a duo concert with Jørgen Munkeby at BlaJazz in Oslo, Norway. In 2002, he formed a Herbie Nichols tribute trio that performed concerts and on radio station KMHD in Portland and KJEX in Seattle, Washington. Later that year he played at The Knitting Factory with Andrew Cyrille and toured extensively with Argentine musicians Diego Chamy and Jorge Hernaez, paid in part by the U.S. State Departments of Argentina and Chile.

His trio was the headline group at the Second International Festival de Jazz de Valparaiso in Chile and several concerts and master classes throughout Argentina. He played a solo concert at Porgy and Bess in Vienna, Austria. In January 2004, Haney toured with Julian Priester, playing at The Jazz Gallery in New York and concerts in France, Belgium, and Germany.

Bob Rusch, founder and publisher of Cadence magazine, announced in 2011 that Haney would take over the magazine in 2012. Haney also publishes The Liturgy Planner to help churches choose music for their services.

Haney has collaborated with Julian Priester, Buell Neidlinger, John Tchicai, Han Bennink, Mat Marucci and Wilbert de Joode and recorded on the Cadence and CIMP labels.

Discography 
 Caramel Topped Terrier (Cadence, 2001)
 For Sale: Five Million Cash (Cadence, 2004) duo with Julian Priester
 Arctic Radio (Arctic, 2005)
 Blues Royale (CIMP, 2007)
 Clandestine (CIMP, 2008)
 Conspiracy A Go Go (CIMP, 2008)
 Blues Royale (CIMP, 2008) with Adam Lane, Mike Biseo
 Blue Flint Girl (CIMP, 2009)
 Live at Yoshi's (Cadence, 2010)
 Solo (City Hall, 2015)
 Avenue of the Americas (CIMP, 2016)
 Live from Jazz Central (Cadence, 2016)
 Selling It Like It Is (Cadence, 2016)
 Stix & Stones: Piano & Drum Duets (Slam, 2016)
 Q Sessions (Slam, 2017)

References

Further reading 
 Richard Cook & Brian Morton: The Penguin Guide to Jazz Recordings, 8th Edition, London, Penguin, 2006

External links
  Blue Flint Girl
 Clandestine and Conspiracy

1955 births
Living people
Musicians from Fresno, California
Musicians from Oregon